Muangthai P.K. Saenchaimuaythaigym is a Muay Thai kickboxer, originally from Nong Ki District. Muangthai (เมืองไทย) is known by his aggressive fight style and angled elbow strikes

Muangthai has fought against high rated Muay Thai champions as Petpanomrung Kiatmuu IX, Saeksan Or. Kwanmuang, Sangmanee Sor Tienpo, Pokkaew Fonjangchonburi, Penake Sitmunoi, Thanonchai Thor. Sangtiannoi, Superbank Mor. Rattanabundit, Saen Paranchai and Superlek Kiatmuu IX

Since 2014, Muangthai trains on P.K. Saenchai Muay Thai Gym, the same training camp of the legendary Muay Thai champion Saenchai Sor Kingstar, Kongsak Saenchaimuaythaigym, Wanchalong and Kaonar and other Muay Thai champions.

In July 2016, Muangthai was the #2 Super-feather weight ranked on Lumpinee Stadium by muaythai2000.com, also ranked #2 Super-Feather weight on Rajadamnern Stadium by muaythai2000.com.

On 27 September 2016, Muangthai was also ranked #1 Super-Feather weight in Thailand by muaythai2000.com.

Titles and accomplishments

Lumpinee Stadium
2012 Lumpinee Stadium Light Flyweight Champion
2016 Lumpinee Stadium Fighter of the Year
 2018 Lumpinee Stadium Fight of the Year (June 5th vs Kulabdam Sor.Jor.Piek-U-Thai)
Professional Boxing Association of Thailand (PAT) 
 2017 Thailand Lightweight Champion

Channel 7 Boxing Stadium
 2014 Channel 7 Stadium Super Featherweight Champion

Fight record

|- style="background:#cfc;"
| 2023-03-17|| Win ||align=left| Kulabdam Sor.Jor.Piek-U-Thai || ONE Friday Fights 9 || Bangkok, Thailand || KO (Elbow) || 3 ||1:37
|-  style="background:#CCFFCC;"
| 2023-01-20|| Win ||align=left| Mavlud Tupiev|| ONE Friday Fights 1, Lumpinee Stadium || Bangkok, Thailand || Decision (unanimous) || 3 || 3:00 
|-  style="background:#CCFFCC;"
| 2022-07-22|| Win ||align=left| Vladimir Kuzmin|| ONE 159 || Kallang, Singapore || Decision (split) || 3 || 3:00 
|-  style="background:#fbb;"
| 2022-04-22|| Loss||align=left|  Liam Harrison || ONE 156 || Kallang, Singapore ||TKO (3 Knockdowns) || 1 || 2:16
|-  style="background:#fbb;"
| 2020-02-09||Loss ||align=left|  Ferrari Jakrayanmuaythai || Srithammaracha + Kiatpetch Super Fight || Nakhon Si Thammarat, Thailand ||Decision|| 5 ||3:00
|-  style="background:#CCFFCC;"
| 2020-01-10|| Win ||align=left| Brice Delval || ONE Championship: A New Tomorrow || Bangkok, Thailand || Decision (split) || 3 || 3:00
|-  style="background:#fbb;"
| 2019-11-07|| Loss ||align=left| Nuenglanlek Jitmuangnon|| Ruamponkon Prachin ||Prachinburi, Thailand|| KO (Elbow) || 4 ||
|-  style="background:#CCFFCC;"
| 2019-10-05 || Win||align=left| Ferrari Jakrayanmuaythai  ||  Suek Muay Thai Vithee || Buriram, Thailand || Decision  || 5 || 3:00
|-  style="background:#CCFFCC;"
|2019-08-16 || Win ||align=left| Kenta || ONE Championship: Dreams of Gold  ||Bangkok, Thailand || Decision (Unanimous) || 3 || 3:00
|-  style="background:#fbb;"
| 2019-05-23 || Loss ||align=left| Yodpanomrung Jitmuangnon || Rajadamnern Stadium || Bangkok, Thailand || Decision  || 5 || 3:00
|-  style="background:#fbb;"
| 2019-03-27 || Loss ||align=left| Nuenglanlek Jitmuangnon || Parunchai Birthday || Thung Song, Thailand || KO (Elbow)|| 2 || 
|-  style="background:#CCFFCC;"
| 2019-01-31 || Win||align=left| Panpayak Jitmuangnon ||  Rajadamnern Stadium || Bangkok, Thailand || KO (Left Elbow)  || 3 || 
|-
|-  style="background:#CCFFCC;"
| 2018-12-21 || Win||align=left| Panpayak Sitchefboontham ||  Rajadamnern Stadium || Bangkok, Thailand || Decision  || 5 ||
|-  style="background:#CCFFCC;"
|2018-11-09 || Win ||align=left| Panicos Yusuf || ONE Championship: Heart of the Lion || Kallang, Singapore || Decision (Unanimous) || 3 || 3:00
|-  style="background:#fbb;"
| 2018-10-05 || Loss ||align=left| Superlek Kiatmuu9 || Muaythai Expo || Buriram, Thailand || Decision || 5 || 3:00
|-  style="background:#fbb;"
| 2018-09-04 || Loss ||align=left| Saeksan Or. Kwanmuang || Lumpineekiatphet, Lumpinee Stadium || Bangkok, Thailand || Decision || 5 || 3:00
|-  style="background:#fbb;"
| 2018-07-06 || Loss ||align=left| Kulabdam Sor.Jor.Piek-U-Thai || Samui Super Fight || Koh Samui, Thailand || TKO (Punches) || 3 || 1:15
|-  style="background:#c5d2ea;"
| 2018-06-05 || Draw ||align=left| Kulabdam Sor.Jor.Piek-U-Thai || Krikkrai Promotion, Lumpinee Stadium || Bangkok, Thailand || Decision || 5 || 3:00
|-  style="background:#CCFFCC;"
| 2018-03-06 || Win ||align=left| Mongkolpetch Petchyindee || Lumpineekiatphet, Lumpinee Stadium || Bangkok, Thailand || Decision || 5 || 3:00
|-  style="background:#fbb;"
| 2018-01-26 || Loss ||align=left| Rambo PetchPTT || Channel 7 Boxing Stadium || Bangkok, Thailand || Decision || 5 || 3:00
|-  style="background:#c5d2ea;"
| 2017-12-08 || Draw ||align=left| Superlek Kiatmuu9 || 61st Anniversary Of Lumpinee Stadium || Bangkok, Thailand || Decision || 5 || 3:00
|-  style="background:#CCFFCC;"
| 2017-11-07 || Win ||align=left| Kulabdam Sor.Jor.Piek-U-Thai || Petchkiatpetch Fight, Lumpinee Stadium || Bangkok, Thailand || Decision || 5 || 3:00
|-  style="background:#fbb;"
| 2017-09-08 || Loss ||align=left| Superlek Kiatmuu9 || Lumpinee Stadium || Bangkok, Thailand || Decision || 5 || 3:00
|-  style="background:#CCFFCC;"
| 2017-08-05 || Win ||align=left| Han Zihao ||Topking World Series || Thailand || Decision || 3 || 3:00
|-  style="background:#fbb;"
| 2017-07-14 || Loss ||align=left| Saeksan Or. Kwanmuang || || Koh Samui, Thailand || Decision || 5 || 3:00
|-  style="background:#CCFFCC;"
| 2017-05-05 || Win ||align=left| Yodlekpet Or. Pitisak || Kiatpetch Fight, Lumpinee Stadium || Bangkok, Thailand || Decision || 5 || 3:00
|-  style="background:#CCFFCC;"
| 2017-03-07 || Win ||align=left| Rambo PetchPTT || Onesongchai Fight, Lumpinee Stadium || Bangkok, Thailand || Decision || 5 || 3:00
|-
! style=background:white colspan=9 |
|-  style="background:#fbb;"
| 2017-02-11 || Loss ||align=left| Rambo PetchPTT ||  || Thailand || Decision || 5 || 3:00
|-  style="background:#fbb;"
| 2017-01-24 || Loss ||align=left| Rambo PetchPTT || Petchkiatpetch Fight, Lumpinee Stadium || Bangkok, Thailand || Decision || 5 || 3:00
|-  style="background:#fbb;"
| 2016-12-09 || Loss ||align=left| Yodpanomrung Jitmuangnon || Lumpinee Stadium || Bangkok, Thailand || Decision || 5 || 3:00
|-
! style=background:white colspan=9 |
|-  style="background:#CCFFCC;"
| 2016-11-14|| Win||align=left| Kaimukkao Por.Thairongruangkamai ||  Rajadamnern Stadium || Bangkok, Thailand || KO (Left Upper Elbow) || 3 || 1:00
|-  style="background:#CCFFCC;"
| 2016-09-30 || Win||align=left| Petpanomrung Kiatmuu9  ||  Lumpinee Stadium || Bangkok, Thailand || KO (Elbow) || 2 || 1:22
|-  style="background:#CCFFCC;"
| 2016-09-02 || Win||align=left|  Yodlekpet Or. Pitisak  ||  Lumpinee Stadium || Bangkok, Thailand || Decision || 5 || 3:00
|-  style="background:#CCFFCC;"
| 2016-07-21|| Win||align=left| Thaksinlek Kiatniwat ||  Rajadamnern Stadium || Bangkok, Thailand || KO (Left Elbow)|| 3 || 2:03
|-  style="background:#fbb;"
| 2016-06-09 || Loss ||align=left| Sangmanee Sor Tienpo || Rajadamnern Stadium || Bangkok, Thailand || TKO (Referee Stoppage)|| 4 ||
|-  style="background:#CCFFCC;"
| 2016-03-28|| Win||align=left| Saen Parunchai  ||  Southern Thailand || Thailand || KO (Left Upper Elbow) || 4 || 0:13
|-  style="background:#CCFFCC;"
| 2016-03-04 || Win||align=left| Saen Parunchai  ||  Kriekkrai Fights, Lumpinee Stadium || Bangkok, Thailand || Decision || 5 || 3:00
|-  style="background:#CCFFCC;"
| 2016-01-24 || Win ||align=left| Sangmanee Sor Tienpo   || Samui Festival || Koh Samui, Thailand || Decision || 5 || 3:00
|-  style="background:#CCFFCC;"
| 2015-12-23|| Win ||align=left|   Thaksinlek Kiatniwat || Rajadamnern Birthday Show, Rajadamnern Stadium || Bangkok, Thailand || KO (Left Elbow)|| 3 || 1:10
|-  style="background:#fbb;"
| 2015-11-10|| Loss ||align=left| Saeksan Or. Kwanmuang || Petkiatpet Fights, Lumpinee Stadium || Bangkok, Thailand || Decision || 5 || 3:00
|-  style="background:#CCFFCC;"
| 2015-10-14|| Win ||align=left|   Phet Utong Or. Kwanmuang  || Onesongchai Anniversary Show, Rajadamnern Stadium || Bangkok, Thailand || KO (Right Upper Elbow)|| 3 || 2:18
|-  style="background:#fbb;"
| 2015-09-04 || Loss ||align=left| Sangmanee Sor Tienpo || Lumpinee Champion Krikkrai Fight, Lumpinee Stadium || Bangkok, Thailand || Decision || 5 || 3:00
|-  style="background:#fbb;"
| 2015-08-11 || Loss ||align=left| Kwankhao Mor.Ratanabandit || Petchyindee Fight Fight, Lumpinee Stadium || Bangkok, Thailand || Decision || 5 || 3:00
|-  style="background:#CCFFCC;"
| 2015-07-02|| Win ||align=left|  Thanonchai Thanakorngym  || Tor.Chaiwat Fight, Rajadamnern Stadium || Bangkok, Thailand || Decision|| 5 || 3:00
|-  style="background:#fbb;"
| 2015-05-10|| Loss ||align=left| Genji Umeno || Wanchai+PK MuayThai Super Fight || Nagoya, Japan || TKO (Punches)|| 4 || 1:09
|-  style="background:#fbb;"
| 2015-05-01|| Loss ||align=left| Saeksan Or. Kwanmuang || Southern Thailand || Thailand || Decision || 5 || 3:00
|-  style="background:#CCFFCC;"
| 2015-03-17 || Win ||align=left|  Panphet Kiatjaroenchai  || Lumpinee Stadium || Bangkok, Thailand || KO (Right Upper Elbow)|| 4 || 1:36
|-  style="background:#CCFFCC;"
| 2015-02-03 || Win ||align=left|  Panphet Kiatjaroenchai  || Lumpinee Stadium || Bangkok, Thailand || Decision || 5 || 3:00
|-  style="background:#fbb;"
| 2015-01-08 || Loss ||align=left| Superbank Mor Ratanabandit || Onesongchai Fight, Rajadamnern Stadium || Bangkok, Thailand || Decision || 5 || 3:00
|-  style="background:#CCFFCC;"
| 2014-12-09 || Win ||align=left| Penake Sitnumnoi    || Lumpinee Stadium || Bangkok, Thailand || Decision|| 5 || 3:00
|-  style="background:#CCFFCC;"
| 2014-10-31 || Win ||align=left| Tuanpae TheBestUdon    || Lumpinee Stadium || Bangkok, Thailand || KO (Left Elbow + Right High Kick)|| 4 || 2:13
|-  style="background:#CCFFCC;"
| 2014-09-30 || Win ||align=left| Yokwittaya Petchsimuan    || Lumpinee Stadium || Bangkok, Thailand || Decision || 5 || 3:00
|-  style="background:#CCFFCC;"
| 2014-08-29 || Win ||align=left| Pokaew Fonjangchonburi  || Lumpinee Stadium || Bangkok, Thailand || KO (Left Elbow) || 2 || 1:45
|-  style="background:#fbb;"
| 2014-08-05|| Loss ||align=left| Pokaew Fonjangchonburi || Lumpinee Stadium || Bangkok, Thailand || Decision || 5 || 3:00
|-  style="background:#fbb;"
| 2014-06-28|| Loss ||align=left| Yokwittaya Petchsimuan ||  || Thailand || Decision || 5 || 3:00
|-  style="background:#CCFFCC;"
| 2014-06-01 || Win ||align=left| Chalamtong Sitpanont || Channel 7 Boxing Stadium || Bangkok, Thailand || Decision || 5 || 3:00
|-
! style=background:white colspan=9 |
|-  style="background:#CCFFCC;"
| 2014-05-02 || Win ||align=left| Grandprixnoi Pitakparpadaeng  || Lumpinee Stadium || Bangkok, Thailand || KO (Right Upper Elbow) || 3 || 2:31
|-  style="background:#FFBBBB;"
| 2014- || Loss ||align=left| Tuanpae TheBestUdon   || Channel 7 Boxing Stadium || Bangkok, Thailand || Decision || 5 || 3:00
|-  style="background:#CCFFCC;"
| 2014-01-12|| Win ||align=left| Saksuriya Kaiyanghadao  || Channel 7 Boxing Stadium || Bangkok, Thailand || Decision || 5 || 3:00
|-  style="background:#CCFFCC;"
| 2013-11-10 || Win ||align=left| Tsunami Jor Chaiwat ||  Channel 7 Boxing Stadium || Bangkok, Thailand || KO (Left elbow) ||  ||
|-  style="background:#FFBBBB;"
| 2013-10-18 || Loss ||align=left| Jomphichit Chuwatana || Lumpinee Stadium || Bangkok, Thailand || Decision || 5 || 3:00
|-  style="background:#FFBBBB;"
| 2013-09-26 || Loss ||align=left| Jomphichit Chuwatana || Rajadamnern Stadium || Bangkok, Thailand || Decision || 5 || 3:00
|-  style="background:#CCFFCC;"
| 2013-08-30|| Win ||align=left| Monkaw Chor.Janmanee  || Lumpinee Stadium || Bangkok, Thailand || Decision || 5 || 3:00
|-  style="background:#FFBBBB;"
| 2013-08-05 || Loss ||align=left| Thanonchai Thanakorngym || Rajadamnern Stadium || Bangkok, Thailand || TKO (Referee Stoppage/Broken Teeth)|| 3 || 0:38
|-  style="background:#CCFFCC;"
| 2013-05 || Win ||align=left| Chaylek Kwaitonggym || Channel 7 Boxing Stadium || Bangkok, Thailand || KO ||  ||
|-  style="background:#FFBBBB;"
| 2013-04-18 || Loss ||align=left| Lamnampong Noomjeantawana || Rajadamnern Stadium || Bangkok, Thailand || Decision || 5 || 3:00
|-  style="background:#CCFFCC;"
| 2013-03-22 || Win ||align=left| Ongbak Sitsarawatsua    || Lumpinee Stadium || Bangkok, Thailand || Decision || 5 || 3:00
|-  style="background:#FFBBBB;"
| 2013-02-05 || Loss ||align=left| Suakim Sit Sor Tor Taew  || Lumpinee Stadium || Bangkok, Thailand || TKO (Referee Stoppage/Broken Teeth)|| 3 || 0:38
|-  style="background:#FFBBBB;"
| 2013-01-13|| Loss ||align=left| Ponkrit Chor.Chernkamon  || Channel 7 Boxing Stadium || Bangkok, Thailand || Decision || 5 || 3:00
|-  style="background:#CCFFCC;"
| 2012-11-27 || Win ||align=left| Kengkart Sor Chokkitchai    || Lumpinee Stadium || Bangkok, Thailand || KO (Left Elbow) || 2 || 1:45
|-  style="background:#FFBBBB;"
| 2012-11-06 || Loss ||align=left| Kengkla Por.Pekko  || Lumpinee Stadium || Bangkok, Thailand || Decision || 5 || 3:00
|-  style="background:#FFBBBB;"
| 2012-10-09 || Loss ||align=left| Superlek Kiatmuu9  || Lumpinee Stadium || Bangkok, Thailand || Decision || 5 || 3:00
|-
! style=background:white colspan=9 |
|-  style="background:#FFBBBB;"
| 2012-09-07 || Loss ||align=left| Superlek Kiatmuu9  || Lumpinee Stadium || Bangkok, Thailand || Decision || 5 || 3:00
|-  style="background:#CCFFCC;"
| 2012-08-10|| Win ||align=left| Ponkrit Chor.Chernkamon  || Lumpinee Stadium || Bangkok, Thailand || Decision || 5 || 3:00
|-  style="background:#CCFFCC;"
| 2012-07-03|| Win ||align=left| Karn Kor.Kumpanart    || Lumpinee Stadium || Bangkok, Thailand || Decision || 5 || 3:00
|-  style="background:#CCFFCC;"
| 2012-06-05|| Win ||align=left| Karn Kor.Kumpanart    || Lumpinee Stadium || Bangkok, Thailand || Decision || 5 || 3:00
|-  style="background:#CCFFCC;"
| 2012-05-15 || Win ||align=left| Kengkla Por.Pekko    || Lumpinee Stadium || Bangkok, Thailand || KO (Right elbow) || 3 ||
|-  style="background:#CCFFCC;"
| 2012-04-20 || Win ||align=left| Jingreedtong Por.Worasing    || Lumpinee Stadium || Bangkok, Thailand || TKO || 3 ||
|-  style="background:#CCFFCC;"
| 2012-03-09|| Win ||align=left| Kongburee Wor.Sungprapai    || Lumpinee Stadium || Bangkok, Thailand || Decision || 5 || 3:00
|-
! style=background:white colspan=9 |
|-  style="background:#CCFFCC;"
| 2012-02-10 || Win ||align=left| Yodpaytai Chor.Patcharaphon || Lumpinee Stadium || Bangkok, Thailand || Decision || 5 || 3:00
|-  style="background:#CCFFCC;"
| 2012-01-17 || Win ||align=left| Yodpaytai Chor.Patcharaphon || Lumpinee Stadium || Bangkok, Thailand || Decision || 5 || 3:00
|-  style="background:#FFBBBB;"
| 2011-11-22 || Loss ||align=left| Sarawuth Pithakpabhadiang  || Lumpinee Stadium || Bangkok, Thailand || Decision || 5 || 3:00
|-  style="background:#CCFFCC;"
| 2011-11-01|| Win ||align=left| Phetkarat Jitmuangnont   || Lumpinee Stadium || Bangkok, Thailand ||TKO || 4 ||
|-  style="background:#CCFFCC;"
| 2011-10-11|| Win ||align=left| Suakim Sitjaetaew  || Lumpinee Stadium || Bangkok, Thailand || Decision || 5 || 3:00
|-  style="background:#CCFFCC;"
| 2011-09-06|| Win ||align=left| Suakim Sitjaetaew || Lumpinee Stadium || Bangkok, Thailand || KO (Left Elbow) || 2 || 1:45
|-  style="background:#c5d2ea;"
| 2011-07-22|| Draw ||align=left| Suakim Sitjaetaew || Lumpinee Stadium || Bangkok, Thailand || Decision || 5 || 3:00 
|-  style="background:#CCFFCC;"
| 2011-06-28|| Win ||align=left| Suakim Sitjaetaew || Lumpinee Stadium || Bangkok, Thailand || Decision || 5 || 3:00
|-  style="background:#CCFFCC;"
| 2011-05-27|| Win ||align=left| Kanongsuek Sor.Sritong  || Lumpinee Stadium || Bangkok, Thailand || Decision || 5 || 3:00
|-  style="background:#CCFFCC;"
| 2011-02-06|| Win ||align=left| Amata Por Tongboran   || Channel 7 Boxing Stadium || Bangkok, Thailand || Decision || 5 || 3:00
|-  style="background:#CCFFCC;"
| 2010-10-26|| Win ||align=left| Chockchai Phetpracha     || Lumpinee Stadium || Bangkok, Thailand || TKO || 3 ||
|-  style="background:#FFBBBB;"
| 2010-09-03 || Loss ||align=left| Kataphet Sor.Suradet  || Lumpinee Stadium || Bangkok, Thailand || TKO || 5 ||
|-  style="background:#CCFFCC;"
| 2010-04-23|| Win ||align=left| Phetsiam Sakburirum     || Lumpinee Stadium || Bangkok, Thailand || TKO || 4 || 
|-
| colspan=9 | Legend:

References

1995 births
Muangthai P.K. Saenchaimuaythaigym
Living people
Muangthai P.K. Saenchaimuaythaigym
ONE Championship kickboxers